The 2013–14 Connacht Rugby season was the team's thirteenth season competing in the Pro12 as well as their third season to compete in the Heineken Cup. Following the departure of Eric Elwood, the 2013–14 season saw Pat Lam take charge of the team as head coach.

Review

Background
The previous season's head coach Eric Elwood departed Connacht at the end of his third year in charge, having announced his intention to leave his post in October 2012. His replacement was announced in January 2013, with the New Zealand born former Samoa international Pat Lam appointed to coach the team. Lam had previously served as head coach to Super Rugby side the Auckland Blues, coaching them in the 2009 and 2010 seasons.

It was announced in August 2013 that the captaincy for the 2013–14 season would be split between Gavin Duffy, John Muldoon (rugby player born 1982) and the team's most capped player, Michael Swift. This followed changes between Duffy and Muldoon as captain in previous seasons.

The team qualified for their third Heineken Cup in a row in 2013–14, again thanks to Leinster, who had also been the reason for Connacht's entry into the previous two tournaments. The eastern province's victory in the 2012–13 European Challenge Cup granted Connacht a berth, and they were drawn into pool 3 with Saracens, Toulouse, and Zebre.

Playing season
Lam's first competitive game in charge was in the 2013–14 Pro12, a 25–16 home win over Zebre. After this game Connacht failed to win their next five games, though they ran Saracens close in Galway, in the first Heineken Cup game of the season. Connacht eventually broke their losing streak with a win in the Heineken Cup, again coming against Zebre, this time in the Stadio XXV Aprile. In their next match, Connacht came close to beating Leinster in Dublin for the first time since 2002, but conceded a late penalty try to lose 16–13.

The team's patchy form continued after the derby with Leinster, and Connacht lost three more games in the Pro12. After a 43–10 defeat to Edinburgh in Murrayfield, former captain of the Super Rugby side the Chiefs, Craig Clarke, was made Connacht's team captain. On 8 December 2013, however, Connacht defied their form and produced one of the biggest shocks in the history of the Heineken Cup, when they defeated Toulouse in the pool stages in the Stade Ernest-Wallon.

Connacht were beaten by Toulouse in the return game at the Sportsground, but beat Zebre in the following game to go into the final round of matches with a slim chance of progressing to the quarter-finals. That game however, saw them beaten comfortably by Saracens on a final score of 64–6, with English side running in a record 11 tries. In the league Connacht continued to tussle with Zebre at the foot of the table, before going on a four match winning streak from 15 February to 23 March, earning three try bonus points. This was the team's longest run of wins in 11 years. Following this run of form though, Connacht failed to win another match in the league, finishing in tenth place and level on points with Newport Gwent Dragons in ninth.

Coaching and Management Staff

Senior Playing Squad

 Players qualified to play for Ireland on dual nationality or residency grounds*.
 Senior 15's internationally capped players in bold.

Academy squad

 year 2
 year 2
 year 2
 year 1
 year 1
 year 2
 year 1
 year 1
 year 1
 year 1
 year 1

 year 2
 year 1
 year 3
 year 3
 year 3
 year 1
 year 3
 year 2
 year 2
 year 1

Preseason transfers

Senior Players In
 HK  Dave Heffernan promoted from academy
 HK  Seán Henry from  Munster
 HK  James Rael from  Munster Academy
 LK  Craig Clarke from  Chiefs
 LK  Aly Muldowney from  Exeter Chiefs
 LK  Danny Qualter promoted from academy
 FL  Aaron Conneely promoted from academy 
 FL  Jake Heenan from  Blues Academy
 SH  Kieran Marmion promoted from academy
 FH  Craig Ronaldson from  Lansdowne
 CE  Robbie Henshaw promoted from academy
 WG  Fionn Carr from  Leinster
 FB  James So'oialo from  Northern United

Senior Players Out
 HK  Adrian Flavin retired 
 HK  Ethienne Reynecke to  
 LK  Dave Gannon to  Life Running Eagles
 LK  Mike McCarthy to  Leinster
 FL  TJ Anderson to  Ealing Trailfinders
 FL  Eoghan Grace to  Plymouth Albion 
 FL  Johnny O'Connor retired
 SH  Dave Moore to undeclared
 FH  Matthew Jarvis to  Nottingham
 WG  James Loxton to  Cardiff
 WG  Mark McCrea to  Jersey
 WG  Fetu'u Vainikolo to  Exeter Chiefs
 FB  James So'oialo to  Tawa

Playing kit
The Connacht team and support staff kit supplier for the season was Australian manufacturer BLK sport, who announced a comprehensive four-year agreement to supply the full range of apparel for all of Connacht Rugby's representative teams and support staff in 2013. They took the place of previous supplier RugbyTech.

Mazda Ireland continued as the main shirt sponsors, as part of a deal signed with Connacht to run from 2012 to 2014 as part of major sponsorship deal to facilitate the development of both brands.

2013–14 Pro12

The weekend dates for the 2013–14 season were announced on 19 July 2013.
  All times are local.

2013–14 Heineken Cup
Pool 3

See also
 2013–14 Munster Rugby season

Notes

References

2013-14
2013–14 Pro12 by team
2013–14 in Irish rugby union
2013–14 Heineken Cup by team